Clinton Theron (born 3 November 1995) is a South African rugby union player, currently playing with Currie Cup side the . He can play as a loosehead or tighthead prop.

Rugby career

Schoolboy rugby

Theron was born in Florida and attended Hoërskool Florida.

Golden Lions

In 2015, he was included in the  squad that competed in the 2015 Vodacom Cup competition. He made eleven appearances for the  team in Group A of the 2015 Under-21 Provincial Championship, scoring a try against  in his first start.

References

South African rugby union players
Living people
1995 births
People from Roodepoort
Golden Lions players
Lions (United Rugby Championship) players
Rugby union props
Rugby union players from Gauteng